Newdegate is a townsite in the Great Southern agricultural region, 399 km south-east of Perth and 52 km east of Lake Grace in Western Australia. The townsite was gazetted in 1925 and honours Sir Francis Newdegate, the Governor of Western Australia from 1920 to 1924.  The Department of Agriculture and Food operates one of its 13 research stations in the area of Newdegate.

Newdegate is situated in the heart of the south-eastern wheatbelt of Western Australia – about halfway between Perth in the west and Esperance in the south-east. It is a very successful grain and sheep farming area. Newdegate is central to the Western Mallee subregion of the Interim Biogeographic Regionalisation for Australia.

The local hall was opened in 1926 by Mr. B Carruthers from Lake Grace. A gold reef was found to the north east of town the same year.

In 1932 the Wheat Pool of Western Australia announced that the town would have two grain elevators, each fitted with an engine, installed at the railway siding.

The surrounding areas produce wheat and other cereal crops. The town is a primary site receival site for Cooperative Bulk Handling.

Field days
The annual Newdegate machinery field days have been held for more than 45 years.  Displays include machinery and farm equipment as well as sheep and shearing competitions, fleece competitions, a ewe/hogget competition, cattle displays, wine tasting, art competition and exhibition, live music and entertainment. In 2007 a natural fibre fashion award was held.

References

External links
Field Days website

Towns in Western Australia
Grain receival points of Western Australia
Shire of Lake Grace